Stanley "Stan" Smith (22 February 1910 – 3 June 1978) was an English professional rugby league footballer who played in the 1920s and 1930s, and coached in the 1940s.

Background
Stanley Smith worked as a foreman at a stone quarry in Tadcaster.

Playing career

Club career
Smith started his career at Wakefield Trinity before he was transferred to Leeds during January 1930 for a record fee of £1,075, (based on increases in average earnings, this would be approximately £307,200 in 2014). Smith played , i.e. number 5, in Leeds' 2–8 defeat by Hunslet in the Championship Final during the 1937–38 season at Elland Road, Leeds on Saturday 30 April 1938.

Smith retired from first class rugby in January 1940 having played for Leeds for 10 years. He had a long-standing plan to retire from rugby so that he and his wife Hilda could focus on running their pub the Butchers Arms on Williams Street in Wakefield but the outbreak of WWII saw him joining the Army at the age of 30. Stan served in the REME seeing service throughout the North African and Italian campaigns and returning home in late 1945.

International honours
Stan Smith won caps for England while at Leeds in 1931 against Wales, in 1932 against Wales (2 matches), in 1934 against Australia, and France, in 1935 against France, and won caps for Great Britain while at Wakefield Trinity in 1929 against Australia, while at Leeds in 1930 against Australia (2 matches), in 1932 against Australia (3 matches), and New Zealand (3 matches), and in 1933 against Australia (2 matches).

Stan Smith played twice for an Rugby League XIII against France.  Playing at left-wing on both occasions, the first was at Wilderspool Stadium, Warrington on 17 March 1934 when the English team won 32–16, this game was also the first international match played by the France national rugby league team. The second was at Headingley Rugby Stadium, Leeds just over a year later, on 6 May 1935 when the English side won 25–18.

County honours
Stan Smith won cap(s) for Yorkshire while at Wakefield Trinity.

County Cup Final appearances
Stanley Smith played , i.e. number 5, in Leeds' 14–8 victory over Huddersfield in the 1937–38 Yorkshire County Cup Final during the 1937–38 season at Belle Vue, Wakefield on Saturday 30 October 1937.
The record for the most tries in a Yorkshire County Cup Final is 4-tries, and is jointly held by; Stan Moorhouse, Alan Smith, and Stanley Smith.

Genealogical information
Stan had family links to several well known rugby players, notably in the Batten and Metcalfe families. Stan's mother Selena and Billy Batten's wife Annie were sisters so Billy was Stan's uncle by marriage and Billy's rugby playing sons, Billy (Jr), Eric and Bob, and his grandson Ray were Stan's cousins. 
Whilst a player at Trinity Stan became good friends with his teammate Jimmy Metcalfe the son of James Davis Metcalfe who played at full back for Trinity in the period 1897-1911. Jimmy (Jr) introduced Stan to his sister Hilda and the two were married in 1932. Jimmy's (Jr) son Donald Metcalfe, played for Trinity in the 1950s and was Stan's nephew by marriage.

Note
During the late 1950/60s there was a rugby league footballer who played for Wakefield Trinity, and Bramley, who was also called Stanley "Stan" Smith. These Stanley "Stan" Smith's are clearly not the same person and they are not related.

References

External links
Billy Batten Biography

1910 births
1978 deaths
England national rugby league team players
English rugby league coaches
English rugby league players
Featherstone Rovers coaches
Great Britain national rugby league team players
Leeds Rhinos players
Place of birth missing
Place of death missing
Rugby league wingers
Rugby League XIII players
Wakefield Trinity players
Yorkshire rugby league team players